Francis James Hesham (1879 – 17 November 1915) was an English professional footballer who played in the Football League for Manchester City, Oldham Athletic and Stoke.

Career
Hesham began his career with Manchester City, for whom he made two appearances during the 1896–97 season. After three years with non-league club Gorton St Francis, he made a further appearance for Manchester City in January 1901. He then began a journeyman career and played for Crewe Alexandra (two spells), Accrington Stanley, Leyton, Oldham Athletic, Preston North End, Croydon Common and Newton Heath Alliance, before retiring in 1913.

Personal life 
Hesham was married with a son. Prior to the First World War, he served in the Manchester Regiment and later worked as a clerk in Manchester. In November 1914, during the early months of the war, Hesham enlisted as a gunner in the Royal Garrison Artillery. He was posted to France in May 1915 and was killed near Ypres on 17 November 1915. Hesham was buried in La Clytte Military Cemetery.

Career statistics

References

English footballers
Accrington Stanley F.C. (1891) players
Crewe Alexandra F.C. players
Manchester City F.C. players
Oldham Athletic A.F.C. players
Preston North End F.C. players
Stoke City F.C. players
English Football League players
1879 births
1915 deaths
Military personnel from Manchester
Leyton F.C. players
Association football outside forwards
Croydon Common F.C. players
People from Gorton
British Army personnel of World War I
British military personnel killed in World War I
Manchester Regiment soldiers
Royal Garrison Artillery soldiers
Burials in Commonwealth War Graves Commission cemeteries in France